The following is a list of massacres that have occurred in Argentina (numbers may be approximate):

Argentina
Massacres